Tom Penny  (born 13 October 1994) is an English rugby union player who plays for Newcastle Falcons in the Premiership Rugby.

Penny started playing rugby aged four at Alnwick, a club he represented up to the age of 16 along with his school rugby at RGS Newcastle. He joined the Falcons' junior academy at the age of 11, also playing for England Under-18s at international level. 

He made his first team debut for Newcastle in the 2013-14 Anglo-Welsh Cup. He scored his first two tries in his debut in the European Rugby Challenge Cup against Romanian side Bucuresti Wolves back in October 2014. He made his Premiership Rugby debut from off the bench against Saracens back in December 2014. 

A broken arm and then a serious knee ligament injury restricted Penny to just a single senior appearance during the 2016-17 season.

On 27 December 2019, Penny signed for Harlequins for the remainder of the 2019-20 season. He made his debut for Harlequins on the starting XV against Clermont Auvergne in the 2019–20 European Rugby Champions Cup. 

On 25 August 2020, Penny resigns with his hometown club Newcastle Falcons on a two-year deal from the 2020-21 season.

References

External links
Its Rugby Profile
ESPN Profile
Ultimate Rugby Profile

Living people
1994 births
Rugby union centres
Rugby union wings
Rugby union fullbacks